Graphis may refer to:

Graphis (lichen), a genus in the family Graphidaceae
 Graphis (gastropod), a genus of sea snails in the family Cimidae
Graphis Inc., an international publishing company